Conny is a given name and a surname. Notable people with the name include:

Given name

Men
 Conny Andersson (footballer) (born 1945), Swedish former footballer
 Conny Andersson (racing driver) (born 1939), Swedish former racing driver
 Conny Johansson (born 1971), Swedish former football goalkeeper
 Conny Karlsson (footballer) (born 1953), Swedish football manager and former player
 Conny Karlsson (shot putter) (born 1975), Finnish shot putter
 Conny Månsson (born 1980), Swedish football goalkeeper
 Conny Nimmersjö (born 1967), Swedish musician
 Conny Öhman (1950–2010), Swedish politician
 Conny Rosén (born 1971), Swedish former football goalkeeper
 Conny Strömberg (born 1975), Swedish ice hockey player
 Conny Torstensson (born 1949), Swedish former footballer

Women
 Conny Aerts (born 1966), Belgian astrophysicist
 Conny van Bentum (born 1965), Dutch former swimmer
 Conny Helder (born 1958), Dutch healthcare manager, Minister for Long-term Care and Sport since 2022
 Conny Perrin (born 1990), Swiss tennis player
 Conny Pohlers (born 1978), German former footballer
 Conny Schmalfuss (born 1975), German diver
 Conny Waßmuth (born 1983), German sprint canoer

Nickname

Men
 Conny Bauer (born 1943), German trombone player
 Conny Doyle (1862–1931), Irish-born Major League Baseball player
 Conrad Heidkamp (1905–1994), German footballer
 Conny Mus (1950–2010), Dutch journalist
 Conny Palm (1907–1951), Swedish electrical engineer and statistician
 Conny Plank (1940–1987), German record producer and musician
 Conny van Rietschoten (1926–2013), Dutch yacht skipper
 Conrad Schnitzler (1937–2011), German experimental musician
 Conny Varela (born 1954), Puerto Rican politician
 Conny Veit (born 1949), German musician, singer, composer and painter

Women
 Conny Nxumalo (1967–2020), South African social worker and government official

Stage name
 Conny Bloom, Swedish guitarist and songwriter Ulf Conny Blomqvist, (born 1964)
 Conny Méndez (1898–1979), Venezuelan composer, singer, writer, caricaturist, actress and metaphysicist
 Conny Vandenbos, Dutch singer Jacoba Adriana Hollestelle (1937–2002)
 Conny, stage name of Cornelia Froboess (born 1943), German actress

Surname
 John Canoe (died c. 1725), also known as January Conny, European name given to an Ahanta chief from Axim, Ghana
 Robert Conny (1646?–1713), English physician

See also 
 Socker-Conny, a comic book character created by Joakim Pirinen
 Conrad (disambiguation)
 Cornelia (disambiguation)

Hypocorisms
Lists of people by nickname
Unisex given names